Ambushed is a 1998 American action thriller film directed by Ernest Dickerson and starring Courtney B. Vance. The film has also been classified as African American noir.

Premise
The leader of a Ku Klux Klan lodge is shot dead and his son is taken into police custody for protection. The police car taking him to a safe house is ambushed and three police officers are shot dead. Officer Jerry Robinson is accused of the murders.

Cast

 Courtney B. Vance as Jerry Robinson
 Jeremy Lelliott as Eric Natter
 Virginia Madsen as Lucy Monroe
 William Forsythe as Mike Organski
 David Keith as Deputy Lawrence
 Bill Nunn as Watts Fatboy
 Charles Hallahan as Sheriff Carter
 Robert Patrick as Shannon Herrold
 William Sadler as Jim Natter
 Carl Espy as Deputy Bean
 Scott Hinson as Deputy Dunbar
 William Flaman as Tom
 J. Michael Hunter as Mintz
 Scott Simpson as Richter
 Don Hall as Billy Dean
 Travis Stanberry as Danny
 Jim Grimshaw as Officer Newfield
 Ernest Dickerson Jr. as J.J. Robinson
 Kenya Bennett as Diner Waitress
 April Turner as Connie Jackson
 Richard K. Olsen as Motel Manager
 Lou Criscuolo as Man in Bathrobe
 Nora Cook as Nancy Richter
 Nina Repeta as Mary Natter
 Samantha Agnoff as Karen Natter
 Dale Frye as Aryan #1
 Lex Geddings as Aryan #2
 Jackie Dickerson as Store Clerk

Production 
Filming for Ambushed took place in Bolivia and North Carolina, with some filming occurring at the Orton Plantation.

Release 
Ambushed premiered on HBO on June 26, 1998.

Themes 
William Covey has classified this film, along with Across 110th Street, Deep Cover, Detroit 9000, The Glass Shield, and Devil in a Blue Dress as examples of films that "locate crime and criminality within white culture, while the moral center of each film is marked by black male heroism."

Reception
Ambushed received reviews from The Chucks Connection and TV Guide, the latter of which called it " boisterous but none too convincing. ... Short on logic and long on polemics, this pumped-up action pic dashes to a predictable, preordained conclusion." The Guardian was more favorable, noting that "his unfussy, effective approach augurs well for his directorial career".

References

External links

1998 action thriller films
1998 films
1990s chase films
1990s thriller drama films
1990s gang films
1998 independent films
1998 action drama films
American action thriller films
American chase films
American gang films
American independent films
Films about children
Films about families
Films about friendship
Films about murder
Films about racism
Films about the Ku Klux Klan
Films directed by Ernest Dickerson
Films scored by Terry Plumeri
1990s American films